Kelly Severide is a fictional character on the NBC drama Chicago Fire. As 2nd shift's lieutenant at Firehouse 51, Severide is the leader of Rescue Squad 3. Severide is portrayed by Taylor Kinney.

Background and characterization

Severide graduated at the top of class at the academy and held the record for the youngest firefighter to make squad when he was 23 years old. He and his long-time colleague and close friend Matthew Casey of Truck 81 have known each other since their days at the fire academy but have a falling-out over the death of their friend and colleague Andy Darden, whom Severide has known since childhood, over a botched-up call, which is where the pilot picks up. They work things out by the end of the season.

The son of CFD Captain Benny Severide (Treat Williams), Kelly was raised by his mother, Jennifer Sheridan (Kim Delaney), after Benny left the family when Kelly was in elementary school. Although Kelly has since reconnected with his father, they still share a love-hate relationship. He is often known to the "white shirts" (high-ranking officers) as Benny's son but never used his father's name to advance his career, instead carving out his own reputation as a highly competent firefighter with excellent arson investigative instincts. By Season 8, Kelly is being openly recruited by the CFD's Office of Fire Investigation, though he consistently maintains his desire to remain with Squad.

His charismatic personality makes him a popular figure with both his colleagues and the ladies. He tends to be casual with his men and can be seen at the squad table or in the lounge chatting or playing cards with the rest of the firehouse. Despite this, he tends to keep his private problems to himself and lets it simmer, which often worries his chief. In contrast to Casey, he is highly adept at reading people, especially his own colleagues, and his observation skills have come to the fore in several arson investigations; in season 2, he correctly predicted that Hadley had been targeting the men of 51 and that Candidate Rebecca Jones, who committed suicide just months after graduating from the academy, lacked the discretion and inhibitions to truly excel as a firefighter (although she was later revealed to suffer from clinical depression).

Character arc

At the beginning of season 1, Severide is at loggerheads with Matthew Casey over the death of a colleague and is plagued with a back injury that puts his career in jeopardy. He hides this from everyone except Shay, from whom he gets painkillers to deal with his injury. When he finally sees a doctor, he is told that his condition is severe and he will no longer be able to keep his job. His girlfriend at the time, Renee Royce, tells him of an experimental procedure, which he undergoes to save his spine. After the injury, a paramedic candidate threatens his career with a false allegation of sexual harassment, however charges were dropped after Antonio Dawson runs a background check on her and discovers that she is a fraudster. In Season 2, Kelly discovers he has a half-sister, Katie Nolan, who is a culinary student. He tries to reach out to her but she is initially hesitant as she and her mother had been abandoned by his father Benny. The two become close and Kelly is shown to be very protective of her. In the episode "Tonight's The Night" of season 2, Katie is kidnapped and Severide tries to find her in the following episodes. After she is found, she leaves for Colorado. When Katie's kidnapper disappears, Severide becomes a suspect. However, Benny Severide is revealed to be responsible but is let off by Detective Voight after Benny explains himself.

In Season 3, Severide has plunged into grief with Shay's death during a call (later discovered to be murder and arson). He and Gabby Dawson aid Detective Voight's team in the preliminary investigations, which leads them to a series of unsolved arson cases, including the fire that killed Mills' father and seriously injured Chief Boden. The case crosses-over into the Chicago P.D. episode "A Little Devil Complex" and the perpetrator is killed by Antonio Dawson. Severide moves in with Casey and Dawson and avoids the apartment he and Shay shared as he is unable to face the loss of his best friend.

Severide is demoted in season 4 as part of Chief Riddle's plan to make Fire Commissioner by replacing Severide with Captain Dallas Patterson and then ousting Boden as Battalion Chief. The men of Squad 3 remain loyal to him despite Patterson's efforts to win them over. Severide has a tough time during his demotion, constantly being undermined by Patterson. Patterson ordering him does not sit well with him and he has a hard time accepting that he's no longer Lieutenant. He gets suspended for a shift for threatening to hit Patterson. Severide and Gabby think Dallas is trying to replace everyone and get them all fired. Patterson doesn't understand this accusation and has a hard time understanding what he's doing wrong, but the fact that he is slightly unfriendly makes them all wary of him. Benny gives Severide a file on him to ultimately blackmail Patterson, Severide decides to hand the file to him. Patterson still doesn't understand why he would give it to him but he helps to calm Riddle down after Boden charges at him with accusations, which Severide is surprised to see. He and Boden are later reinstated as Patterson is revealed to have used his connections to Riddle to implicate the latter for corruption.

In a Chicago P.D. crossover episode "Don't Bury this Case", Severide is accused of a hit-and-run accident, which later turns into vehicular homicide when one of the victims, a child, dies from her injuries. Lindsay and Voight suspect that Severide was set up, while friendships and relationships are put to the test as the detectives and cops are forced to toe a very thin line with their friends at Firehouse 51 as the evidence against Severide mounts. When drug and alcohol abuse from his past comes to light, detectives within Intelligence are skeptical in believing his innocence. He is eventually found to be innocent.

Severide temporarily blames Cruz for Herrmann getting stabbed by Freddy for bringing him to the firehouse in the first place and pressures him in to finding Freddy when he runs away. Chief Boden tells him to back off. He goes to look for Cruz and tries to find Freddy at their 'gang hideout', telling him to not risk his life unless he wants to be the one in the hospital. 

Kelly develops a brief attachment to Bianca Holloway at CPD when he tries to tell her that a missing body they find is a young girl who disappeared from his neighbourhood a few years ago. She is initially irritated at his efforts in trying to identify the girl and tells him to back off. However, Severide is right and later on, she asks him for a favour - to look after her son JJ - while she prepares for a court hearing on a dangerous gang she has been detecting for some years. On the day of the hearing, she drops JJ off with Kelly for a few hours. However, CPD is soon at the firehouse and informs Severide that Detective Holloway was shot outside the court. He is upset to hear this but insists that JJ stay with him until his aunt, who has requested not to tell JJ about this, has flown in from California. The firehouse help JJ with a school project, trying to divert his attention from his mother. A few hours later, Detective Crowley from CPD is back to tell Severide that Holloway died during surgery. He still insists that JJ stays with him until her sister arrives. She arrives later that night and asks Kelly to help her break the news to JJ. They tell him with the whole firehouse watching from the window. He breaks down and Mary takes him away. Just before he leaves, Severide gives Pouch, their dog who has also grown close to JJ.

Severide later has trouble with his relationships and starts thinking about his life. He is injured in an accident and doesn't get it checked out until Chief forces him to. He meets Chicago Med's Dr Clarke - a past friend of his, who asks him to take a quick blood sample and enroll on the bone marrow registry.  After seeing the woman he is a match for, Severide agrees. Clarke tells him he'll feel the pain for months, to which he replies, "good". After donating his bone marrow, they develop a relationship for a few months, however her cancers returns and she eventually dies in his presence.

In season 8, Severide is offered a temporary position as an investigator for the Office of Fire Investigation (OFI). He initially turns it down, but is later assigned to the Office of Fire Investigations at the request of Fire Commissioner Grissom (Gary Cole). Severide goes to Grissom to confront him about the assignment, but Grissom convinces him to accept the assignment, and Severide asks for Grissom to shut down the investigation into Christopher Herrmann after he confronts a Chicago Police officer during a call. In the episode "Stand Our Ground", he returns to Firehouse 51 after completing his stint working as a Fire Investigator.

Relationships

Women

A recurring theme for the character is his merry-go-round of relationships and flings with various women. Severide was engaged to Renee Whaley, the sister of fellow firefighter Lieutenant Eric Whaley, but he called it off after she cheated on him with an ex-boyfriend. Lieutenant Whaley initially hated Severide, thinking the latter was the one who broke Renee's heart. Severide had refused to tell him the real story to protect Renee's reputation. After the two get into an intense argument, he finally tells Whaley everything and admitted that he never really moved on from her.

Midway through Season 1, Severide is in a relationship with Renée Royce (Sarah Shahi), a lawyer whom 51 rescued. She asks him to relocate with her to Spain and he was about to do so, much to the surprise of his friends and co-workers, but ultimately decided to stay in Chicago. In the season finale, she returns to Chicago pregnant. However, Shay hints to Severide that Renée could not possibly be pregnant with his child given the timeline. Renée confesses to Severide that the baby is not his and they part ways once again.

Severide dates Detective Erin Lindsay, whom he first met when she was assigned to investigate the abduction of his half-sister Katie, and their relationship becomes serious. With Shay's death in the line of duty (later ruled to be a homicide caused by arson), Severide spirals out of control, isolating himself from his co-workers at 51 and Lindsay. She breaks up with him after he misses another date telling him that while she can empathize with him, she can’t "be the girl sitting alone in a restaurant waiting for [him]."

In Season 3, while still mourning over Shay's death, Severide takes a trip to Las Vegas and meets Brittany Baker (Serinda Swan), a graphic designer, at the craps table. They marry and she moves in with Severide, shocking his colleagues and Chief Boden. Brittany moves in with Severide and into Casey and Dawson's guestroom. Their relationship and open affection lead to the deterioration of Casey and Dawson's own relationship. Homesick, Brittany finally leaves Chicago, unable to get used to the uncertainty and irregular hours Severide's job as a firefighter entails.

Severide appears to have a romantic interest in April Sexton (Yaya DaCosta), a main character on Chicago Med and an ER nurse at Chicago Medical Center. They have known each other since they were teens as her parents took Severide in when he was going through a rebellious phase in high school. He formally asks her out on date in the Chicago Med episode "Malignant". However, they later break up as April enters a relationship with another man.

In season 5, Severide appears to have a romantic interest towards Anna, a pediatrician of Springfield Hospital. After saving her life by donating bone marrow, Severide visits Springfield after getting an offer from Springfield Fire Department to become a battalion chief. In "Purgatory", he turns it down. Anna moves to Chicago, in order to be close to Severide. When she gets cold feet over moving there, he takes her around the city in particularly, taking her skating. But when Severide's father shows up unannounced with his girlfriend, and crashes Severide's date with Anna, she gets upset. Upon seeing Severide’s father, Anna starts crying and abruptly leaves the table to go outside and hail a cab. As she gets in the cab, she reveals that her parents didn't want her move away nor to stay in the relationship with Severide. Anna agrees with her parents on both points and fears that Severide will turn out to a drunk like his father. She breaks it off with Severide. Later, Severide discovers that Anna has a complication with her cancer, and that prompted her to break up with him. Anna’s father, who visits Severide in his office, asks Severide to not give up on Anna. In "Carry Their Legacy", Severide  carries Anna to the hospital for chemotherapy. In "Carry Me", Anna  dies when the chemotherapy and other methods don't work and it is revealed that she signed a DNR order, leaving Severide to cope with her death.

In Season 6, at the end of "The Chance to Forgive", Severide ends up kissing fellow firefighter Stella Kidd (whom he previously had a romantic fling with) in Molly's when it was closing for the night. In "Where I Want to Be", after learning about his failed relationships, Kidd reconsiders her living arrangements with Kelly by living in Herrmann's attic.

In "The Unrivaled Standard", his old flame Renee Royce returns to Chicago and asks to testify at a hearing of a fellow firefighter, much to Kidd's dismay. In "The Grand Gesture", after Royce kisses Severide, he breaks it off with her and goes to Kidd, when Kidd sees Severide on her bed.

In "Going To War", during an intense fire at an apartment complex, Stella was severely injured after she ran out of oxygen. She was trying to help Severide and didn’t tell Hermann when her levels dropped, and ended up in Chicago Med in critical condition. Severide lashed out at Hermann for not looking out for her, and Hermann said she was trying to save him which is why she didn’t say anything. Connor Rhodes and Ethan Choi informed Severide they would have to remove Stella’s lung to save her. Severide disagreed and said being a firefighter was important to Stella and she wouldn’t want that - he was told he wasn’t family so he couldn’t veto the decision. Ethan even escorted Kelly out of the hospital when he argued, much to April’s dismay. April then arranged for the rest of the firehouse to ask Connor to reconsider on Stella’s behalf, as they were her “family”. Ethan wasn’t happy with this, and accused April of doing that for Severide, and not Stella.

Severide's relationship with Stella becomes strained when he distances himself from her following the death of his father. In "Always a Catch", Severide becomes jealous of Stella's friend, causing even more of a strain on their relationship. In "Inside These Walls", Stella breaks up with Severide, stating that she had already been the lifeline of a man who was having a breakdown and that she could not go through that again. They get back together in "I'm Not Leaving You", where Severide says that she deserves someone better, and he was going to be that someone.

His relationship with Stella is on ice when he starts to pull away from her as she prepares for her Lieutenant's test. Later on, he has an emotional talk with Kidd and he apologized for his behaviour. In "What Comes Next", he confides in Casey he thinks he might want to propose a marriage to Kidd which he rethinks in "A White-Knuckle Panic". However, in this episode, he proposes to Stella and she happily accepts.

Colleagues

Of the ensemble cast of characters, Severide is closest to Matthew Casey of Truck 81 and he developed a bond with the late Leslie Shay. He still considers Shay his best friend and they shared a very close relationship, sharing an apartment for many years.

Severide and Casey have known each other since their academy days and presumably graduated from the same class. In the pilot, their mutual long-time friend and co-worker Andy Darden is killed during a call and causes a rift between the two lieutenants. The episode flashes forward a month later and they are still at loggerheads with one another, with the entire crew at 51 as well as new Candidate Peter Mills caught in the middle. They eventually work it out by the end of the first season. Whenever one of them suffers a loss, they would go out to the driveway to talk over a quick smoke, as both are men of few words, especially regarding their private lives or emotional state. Severide is the only one who calls Casey - Case. (In Season 3 Episode 10, Severide and Casey go to a bar to get over their break-ups with Brittany and Dawson respectively and attempt to pick up a pair of girls named Chloe and Yuma, a reference to the film 3:10 to Yuma, whose screenplay was written by Fire writers and co-creators Derek Haas and Michael Brandt.)

At the end of Matt Casey's farewell episode in Season 10, Severide initiates a group hug with Casey and others in Firehouse 51 and tells Casey he loves him.

Crossover appearances

 Chicago PD: "Chin Check" (January 22, 2014)
 Chicago PD: "At Least It's Justice" (April 2, 2014)
 Chicago PD: "8:30 PM" (April 30, 2014)
 Chicago Med: "Fallback" (December 1, 2015)
 Chicago Med: "Malignant" (January 5, 2016)
Chicago PD: "Justice" (May 11, 2016)
 Chicago Med: "Cold Front" (February 16, 2017)
Chicago PD: "Don't Bury This Case" (January 3, 2017)
Chicago PD: "Emotional Proximity" (March 1, 2017)
Chicago Justice: "Fake" (March 1, 2017)
 Chicago Med: "Over Troubled Water" (January 16, 2018)
 Chicago Med: "When To Let Go" (October 3, 2018)
Chicago PD: "Endings" (October 3, 2018)
Chicago PD: "Good Men" (February 20, 2019)
 Chicago Med: "The Space Between Us" (March 27, 2019)

References

Chicago Fire (TV series) characters
Fictional characters from Chicago
Television characters introduced in 2012
Fictional firefighters
Crossover characters in television